The Wonder of Christmas was recorded during the Mormon Tabernacle Choir's 2001-2005 Christmas shows in the LDS Conference Center with special guests Angela Lansbury, Bryn Terfel, Audra McDonald, Frederica von Stade, Renée Fleming, and Walter Cronkite.  The album was released in 2006.

Christmas concert DVDs

The tracks were compiled from multiple Christmas concerts which were released individually as DVDs, including:
 The Joy of Christmas featuring Angela Lansbury (2003)
 Silent Night, Holy Night with guest conductor Walter Cronkite
 Christmas with the Mormon Tabernacle Choir and Orchestra at Temple Square: Featuring Frederica von Stade and Bryn Terfel (2004)
 Christmas with the Mormon Tabernacle Choir and Orchestra at Temple Square: Featuring Audra McDonald and Peter Graves (2005)
 Christmas with the Mormon Tabernacle Choir and Orchestra at Temple Square: Featuring Renee Fleming and Claire Bloom (2006)

Track listing

Charts

References

Tabernacle Choir albums
2006 Christmas albums
Christmas albums by American artists